Love is Colder Than Death, commonly abbreviated LiCTD or LICTD, is an early German neoclassical dark wave band that was one of the cornerstones to Hyperium Records' Heavenly Voices compilation series of the early 1990s. It is named after the 1969 Fassbinder film . The band's music is characterized by its extensive use of both romantic and classical styled male and female vocals. Founded by Ralf Donis, Maik Hartung, Sven Mertens, and Susann Heinrich in 1990, the band members and music have changed slightly since then. The first few LICTD albums were released on the Hyperium record label in Europe and on the new Metropolis Records label in the United States.

The band's album Teignmouth was the first Metropolis Records release, and remains one of LICTD's more popular albums.  Following the departure of Donis, the more experimental songs that characterized some of the early LICTD work gave way to a much more classical sound.  Eclipse, the latest LICTD album with new content, reached number one on Mexican New Age Sales Charts.

At present, the band is based in Leipzig, Germany.  The band performed at major international festivals including, Wave-Gotik-Treffen in 2003 and 2005 and the annual Bach Festival Leipzig in 2003.

Discography

Full length albums and EPs 
 Wild World Hyperium vinyl EP (1991)
 Teignmouth Hyperium Records / Metropolis Records (1991)
 Mental Traveller Hyperium / Metropolis Records (1992)
 Oxeia Hyperium / Metropolis Records (1994)
 Spellbound Hyperium CDS (1995)
 Atopos Chrom (1999)
 Eclipse In Deyagora Music (2003)
 Tempest In Deyagora Music (2013)

Special releases 
 Two Faces But No Guitars (1990) — MC limited to 20 copies
 Auter Hyperium (1995) — collection CD
 Inside the Bell (2004) — live album limited
 Time (2006) 2CD In Deyagora Music—collection CD limited to 1,000 copies

Compilation appearances 
 Romantic Sound Sampler III Zillo (1991)
 Bouquet of Dreams Dark Star (1991)
 From Hypnotic Hyperium (1992)
 Hyperium Promotional Sampler Hyperium (1992)
 Oxeia on Heavenly Voices Part 2 Hyperium (1993)
 Borderline Messerschmitt (1993)
 We Came to Dance Vol. 1 Sub Terranean (1993)
 Art and Dance Vol. 4 Gothic Arts (1993)
 The Fallen Angel Zoth Ommog (1994)
 Affaire de Coeur (1994)
 Heavenly Voices III Hyperium (1995)
 Zauber of Music Vol. II Hyperium (1995)
 Moonraker Vol. II Sub Terranean (1995)
 Electrocity Vol. 6 Ausfahrt (1995)
 German Mystic Sound Sampler Vol. V Zillo (1995)
 Miroque Sub Terranean (1996)
 Touched By The Hand Of Goth Vol. II Sub Terranean (1996)
 The City In the Sea on Goth Box Disk 3 Cleopatra (1996)
 Hyperium New Classics Vol. 1 Hyperium (1997)
 Love and Solitude on The Black Bible 4CD Cleopatra (1998)
 Wild World on Orkus Presents The Best Of The 90s 3 2CD Orkus (2003)

Band members

Studio and Live 
 Ralf Donis (1990–1993) — vocals
 Maik Hartung (1990–present) — strings/percussion/keyboards
 Sven Mertens (1990–1993, 1997–2011) — backing vocals/percussion/keys
 Susann Porter / Heinrich (1990–1995, 2001–2011) — vocals
 Andrew Porter (1993–1995)- drums, vocals
 Manuela Budich (1997–2000) — vocals
 Helen Landen (2000–2001) — vocals (live)
 Ralf Jehnert (1997–present) — vocals
 Anja Herrmann (2012–2013) — Vocals/Percussion
 Justus Kriewald (2010 - 2012) — Keyboards/Backing Vocals/Bass
 Uli Stornowski (2012–2013) — Percussion/Flute/Backing Vocals

Live only 
 Michael Metzler (2003–Present) — also a member of Sarband
 Neil Rupsch (2010-2011) — Drums
 René Bielig (2010-2011) — Guitars/Bass

External links 
 
 Love Is Colder Than Death - MySpace Fan Page
 
 

Neoclassical dark wave musical groups
Musical groups established in 1990
Metropolis Records artists